Segbroek College is a secondary school in The Hague, Netherlands. It offers Hoger algemeen voortgezet onderwijs (HAVO, general secondary education),  (MAVO), and Voorbereidend wetenschappelijk onderwijs (VWO, university preparatory education) coursework.

References

External links
 Segbroek College 

Secondary schools in the Netherlands
The Hague